In physics, telecommunications, and astronomy, forward scatter is the deflection—by diffraction, nonhomogeneous refraction, or nonspecular reflection by particulate matter of dimensions that are large with respect to the wavelength in question but small with respect to the beam diameter—of a portion of an incident electromagnetic wave, in such a manner that the energy so deflected propagates in a direction that is within 90° of the direction of propagation of the incident wave (i.e., a phase angle greater than 90°). 

The scattering process may be sensitive to polarization; that is, the polarization of incident waves that are identical in every respect may be scattered differently. Forward scatter differs from backscatter.

Comets 
Forward scattering can make a back-lit comet appear significantly brighter because the dust and ice crystals are reflecting and enhancing the apparent brightness of the comet by scattering that light towards the observer. Comets studied forward-scattering in visible-thermal photometry include C/1927 X1 (Skjellerup–Maristany), C/1975 V1 (West), and C/1980 Y1 (Bradfield). Comets studied forward-scattering in SOHO non-thermal C3 coronograph photometry include 96P/Machholz and C/2004 F4 (Bradfield). The brightness of the great comets C/2006 P1 (McNaught) and Comet Skjellerup–Maristany near perihelion were enhanced by forward scattering.

References

External links 
Cassini's Views of Saturn's Rings
Light Scattering Demonstration

Radio frequency propagation
Scattering, absorption and radiative transfer (optics)